Alexander King (27 July 1871 – 12 December 1957) was a Scottish footballer who played for clubs including Heart of Midlothian and Celtic. He scored one of the goals for Hearts as they won the 1896 Scottish Cup Final by 3–1 against Hibernian, and continued his success with Celtic, winning the Scottish Football League title in 1897–98 and the Scottish Cup in 1899.

King represented Scotland six times and played for the Scottish Football League XI four times.

His nephew John King was also a footballer whose clubs included Partick Thistle and Newcastle United.

See also
Played for Celtic and Rangers

References

1871 births
1957 deaths
Footballers from North Lanarkshire
Sportspeople from Shotts
Scottish footballers
Association football wing halves
Association football inside forwards
Heart of Midlothian F.C. players
Celtic F.C. players
Rangers F.C. players
Darwen F.C. players
Wishaw Thistle F.C. players
Albion Rovers F.C. players
Airdrieonians F.C. (1878) players
Dykehead F.C. players
Scottish Football League players
Scotland international footballers
Scottish Football League representative players
St Bernard's F.C. players